Stenocephalum is a genus of flowering plants belonging to the family Asteraceae.

Its native range is Southern Mexico to Guatemala, and Southern Tropical America.

Species
Species:

Stenocephalum apiculatum 
Stenocephalum hexanthum 
Stenocephalum hystrix 
Stenocephalum jucundum 
Stenocephalum megapotamicum 
Stenocephalum monticola 
Stenocephalum tragiifolium

References

Asteraceae
Asteraceae genera